Bosanska Krupa is a municipality located in the Una-Sana Canton of the Federation of Bosnia and Herzegovina, an entity of Bosnia and Herzegovina. As of 2013, it has a population of 29,659 inhabitants.

Geography
Bosanska Krupa is located on the border within the Federation of Bosnia and Herzegovina adjacent to the municipalities of Bužim, Cazin, Bihać, Bosanski Petrovac, Sanski Most, and Krupa na Uni. The last mentioned municipality is part of the Republika Srpska entity and was part of the Bosanska Krupa municipality before the Bosnian War, but after the Dayton Agreement it became a separate municipality.

Settlements

 Arapuša
 Banjani
 Baštra
 Benakovac
 Donja Suvaja
 Drenova Glavica
 Glavica
 Gorinja
 Gornja Suvaja
 Gornji Bušević
 Gornji Petrovići
 Gudavac
 Hašani
 Ivanjska
 Jasenica
 Jezerski
 Ljusina
 Mahmić Selo
 Mali Badić
 Mali Radić
 Ostrožnica
 Bosanska Otoka
 Perna
 Pištaline
 Potkalinje
 Pučenik
 Srednji Bušević
 Srednji Dubovik
 Velika Jasenica
 Veliki Badić
 Veliki Dubovik
 Veliki Radić
 Vojevac
 Voloder
 Vranjska
 Zalin

Demographics

Population

Ethnic composition

Gallery

Notable people
Džemaludin Čaušević, imam
Branko Ćopić, writer (Hašani)
Kosta Hakman, painter
Elvis Mešić, soccer player

See also
Una-Sana Canton
Bosanska Krajina

References

External links

 Official site

 
Populated places in Bosanska Krupa